Vernon County Jail, Sheriff's House and Office, also known as the Bushwhacker Museum, is a historic jail and sheriff's residence located at Nevada, Vernon County, Missouri.  The stone building was built in 1871 and consists of: a two-story, rectangular-plan, Federal-style residence; a two-story, four-room office; and a one-story, rectangular jail.  The building ceased use as a jail in 1960 and houses a local history museum.

It was listed on the National Register of Historic Places in 1977.

References

External links

Bushwhacker Museum

History museums in Missouri
Jails on the National Register of Historic Places in Missouri
Federal architecture in Missouri
Government buildings completed in 1871
Buildings and structures in Vernon County, Missouri
National Register of Historic Places in Vernon County, Missouri